"Footprints in the Sand" is a song recorded by British singer Leona Lewis for her debut studio album Spirit (2007). It was written by Simon Cowell, David Kreuger, Per Magnusson, Richard Page, and produced by Steve Mac. The song was digitally released as Lewis's third single on 9 March 2008 in the United Kingdom. Sony BMG and Syco Music launched it as a double A-side with "Better in Time", and "You Bring Me Down" as the B-side.

It is a R&B and pop song composed with a tempo of sixty beats per minute. It was written in a period of one day at Page's home in Malibu, California, with Cowell giving the idea to base it on the Christian poem "Footprints". The single's music video was filmed by British director Sophie Muller in Johannesburg, South Africa. The video describes social problems within the city, but ends with a message of hope. "Footprints in the Sand" became the official theme of the 2008 version of biennial charity programme Sport Relief, by BBC.

The song received positive reviews from music critics, some of them noting its gospel sounds and Lewis's vocals being compared to American R&B singer Mariah Carey. "Footprints in the Sand" charted as a separate single in Ireland, the United Kingdom and the European Hot 100 Singles, whilst the double A-side appeared in Germany and Switzerland, and was certified gold in the UK by the British Phonographic Industry (BPI), in 2008. In the same year, Lewis performed the song for the first time in the UK live on the television programme Dancing on Ice. In 2009, the song was covered by Lucie Jones, a contestant of The X Factor, and by Julia Star from Swiss programme Die grössten Schweizer Talente.

Production and composition
"Footprints in the Sand" was written by Simon Cowell, David Kreuger, Per Magnusson and Richard Page, whilst the production was helmed by Steve Mac. It was recorded in 2007 at Rokstone Studios in London, England. Cowell originally came up with the idea to base a song around the Christian poem "Footprints", and suggested it to Kreuger and Magnusson. They had a scheduled session in Page's home in Malibu, California and finished the song the next day. Cowell secured a songwriting credit for coming up with the idea. In an interview with HitQuarters, Magnusson said they had thought the song would be a good idea for Irish boy band Westlife, but it was offered to British singer Leona Lewis instead. When Cowell mentioned the song concept to Lewis, she agreed that it could be "really quite interesting". Regarding the song, Lewis commented: "Originally it was a poem; it's very inspirational so we put it into a song. I think it is very moving, with a very emotional lyric and I really love to sing this song"; and added that the poem "[is] about standing by someone and being there for people who need your help."

"Footprints in the Sand" was included on Lewis's debut studio album Spirit, which was released in 2007 by Syco and J Records. The song has a duration of 4:09 and was composed using common time in the key of A major with a larghetto tempo of sixty beats per minute; Lewis's vocals spanned from the low note of E3 to the high note of G5. The song follows the sequence of A5–A5/B–Fm7–E in the verses and A–B–Bm–Fm–G–D in the chorus as its chord progression. It incorporates four instruments: keyboard instruments (a piano, an organ and synthesizers), guitar, bass and drums, and includes a choir performance made by The Tuff Session Singers. It incorporates elements of R&B and pop musical genres, and, according to music critics, contains a gospel production performed by a choir and features "crashing drums".

Release and promotion
On 29 January 2008, Lewis announced on her website that "Footprints in the Sand", along with "Better in Time", would be released as a double A-side. The single was launched with the song "You Bring Me Down" as the B-side, and was released in the United Kingdom as a digital download on 9 March 2008, and a physical release on the following day, with proceeds going to the charity. The song was remixed for the single release ("Single Mix"), which, unlike the original version, begins with Lewis's voice only, and music starts after she performs the first verse—the album version of "Footprints in the Sand" starts with a piano tune before she starts to sing the lyrics—, and lasts at 3:58.

"Footprints in the Sand" became the official song of the charity Sport Relief, a biennial charity organised by Comic Relief and BBC Sport, for their 2008 broadcast. In her performance, Lewis sang the song to the Sports Relief event. Also, there were musicians that played violas, violins, and a piano, and The Tuff Session Singers performed the chorus. Whilst she sang, images of "sadness and desperation" were shown to the public. But, as the Tuff Session Singers began, the third chorus, those images became pictures of "happiness". As part of promotion, Lewis performed the song live on the British television programme Dancing on Ice on 9 March 2008; her song accompanied Torvill and Dean's ice dance routine. In 2013, Lewis added the song to the setlist of her Glassheart Tour.

Music video

The accompanying music video was filmed in Johannesburg, South Africa, and was directed by British director Sophie Muller back-to-back with the video for "Better in Time". It premiered on Lewis official website and BBC Radio 1's website on 27 February 2008. The video begins with the message "Working to change lives across the world, in support of Sport Relief". Then, it intercuts a performance of Lewis in front of a wall and greyscale scenes: an image of a child walking on a landfill site, a funeral, a child lying in the street, and a kid sat in a traffic island. As the first chorus begins, the video continues showing scenes of poverty and AIDS issues in the country. Whilst the second verse goes, pictures of malnourished people appears. As the second chorus and the bridge elapse people crying still coming on the scene. But whereas The Tuff Session Singers start to sing the third chorus, the video begins to show images of kids playing association football and cricket. The video ends with children and people smiling as Lewis sings the outro of the song. It was released on the US iTunes Store on 3 February 2009.

Reception

Critical response
Upon the release of Spirit, "Footprints in the Sand" received generally positive reviews by music critics, with some of them comparing Lewis's performance to other singers such as Mariah Carey and Christina Aguilera. In his review of the album, Chris Elwell-Sutton of the Evening Standard commented that the song would be perfect as a "theme to a Disney movie". Whilst reviewing Spirit, Chad Grischow of IGN Music described "Footprints in the Sand", along with "Here I Am", as a "sleeper ballad". Lyndsey Winship, a reviewer from BBC Music, noted that the song "is a piano warbler that brings Leona's voice to the forefront".

A reviewer for South African news site iafrica.com described the song as a "show-stopping [...] lush Mariah-style ballad [...] that utilises Lewis'[s] full vocal range and sounds uncannily like Carey at her best. Sal Cinquemani of Slant Magazine called it "drippy", and added that with "Footprints" Lewis would receive comparisons to Carey. Digital Spy's reviewers gave similar opinions about "Footprints in the Sand". Nick Levine in his review of the album called the song an "histrionic finale" of Spirit, and added that it "seems hellbent on revisiting Mariah Carey's schlock-pop masterwork 'Anytime You Need a Friend'". After it was released as a single Alex Fletcher claimed it has "the sort of ludicrous outro even Mariah Carey might consider over-the-top" and that its lyrics "will have your granny in tears".

Chart performance

"Footprints in the Sand" charted in Europe, reaching position seventy-three on the European Hot 100 Singles. In November 2007, the song debuted on the UK Singles Chart at number sixty-five, staying on the chart for another week. On 15 March 2008, the single re-entered it at number sixty-three. "Footprints in the Sand" claimed its peak position next week at number twenty-five, staying on the chart for eleven weeks. On the Irish Singles Chart the song debuted and peaked at number fifty; whilst on the Swiss Singles Chart, it debuted on 15 November 2009 at thirty-five, and it stayed there three weeks.

The double A-side "Better in Time" and "Footprints in the Sand" debuted at number seventy-four on the UK Singles Chart on 1 March 2008. After selling 40,476 copies it peaked at number two on 22 March 2008, the same week "Footprints in the Sand" debuted in the top forty. It was Lewis's third single to reach the top five in the UK. It was certified as gold by the British Phonographic Industry (BPI) on 16 January 2009. The single debuted on the German Singles Chart on 16 June 2008 at number five, and reached its peak position, at number two, on 28 July 2008. It also peaked on the European Hot 100 at number eight.

Track listings and formats
CD single (Syco), CD single (RCA) and Swiss CD single
"Better in Time" (Single Mix) – 3:55
"Footprints in the Sand" (Single Mix) – 3:58

German premium single
"Better in Time" (Single Mix) – 3:55
"Footprints in the Sand" (Single Mix) – 3:58
"Bleeding Love" (Moto Blanco Remix Radio Edit) – 3:40
"Better in Time" (Video) – 3:58

Sony single; Swiss maxi single
"Better in Time" (Single Mix) – 3:55
"Footprints in the Sand" (Single Mix) – 3:58
"Bleeding Love" (Moto Blanco Remix Radio Edit) – 3:40

UK Sport Relief CD single
"Better in Time" – 3:55
"Footprints in the Sand" – 4:09
"You Bring Me Down" – 3:54

Credits and personnel

"Footprints in the Sand"
Leona Lewis – vocals
Carmen Reese – background vocals
The Tuff Session Singers – choirs
Steve Mac – arranger, producer, keyboards and synthesizers
Steve Pearce – bass
Dave Arch – piano, organ, strings arranger
John Paricelli – guitars
Chris Laws – recorder, drums, pro–tools editor
Daniel Pursey – recorder
Hayden Bendall – strings recorder
Richard Page – writer
Per Magnusson – writer
David Kreuger – writer
Simon Cowell – writer

"You Bring Me Down"
Leona Lewis – vocals, writer
Salaam Remi – bass, piano, drums, writer
Vincent Henry – saxophone, flute, clarinet
Bruce Purse – trumpet, bass trumpet, flugelhorn
Vlado Meller – master
Manny Marroquin – mixer
Taj Jackson – vocal producer, writer
Gleyder "Gee" Disla – recorder
Franklin "Esoses" Socorro – recorder

Charts

Weekly charts

Year-end charts

Certifications

Release history

References

External links
 Music video at YouTube
 Lyrics at Leona Lewis Official Website

2000s ballads
2007 songs
2008 singles
Charity singles
Contemporary R&B ballads
Leona Lewis songs
Music videos directed by Sophie Muller
Pop ballads
Songs written by Per Magnusson
Songs written by David Kreuger
Songs written by Richard Page (musician)
Comic Relief singles
Syco Music singles
Song recordings produced by Steve Mac
Christian songs
Songs based on poems